Citizens Bank may refer to:

Financial institutions
 Citizens Bank International, a bank in Nepal
 Citizens Business Bank, a bank in California
 Citizens Financial Group, an American bank headquartered in Rhode Island
 Citizens Republic Bancorp, an American bank based in Michigan, acquired by FirstMerit Corporation in 2013

Structures
 Citizens Bank (Williston, Florida), a site on the U.S. National Register of Historic Places
 Citizens Bank (South Bend, Indiana), a site on the U.S. National Register of Historic Places
 Citizens Bank Building (disambiguation), several different buildings
 Citizens Bank Park, a baseball stadium in Philadelphia

See also
 Citizens National Bank (disambiguation)
 Citizens State Bank (disambiguation)